Herve V of Léon was the eldest son of Herve IV of Léon and his wife Maud of Poissy.

Life 
After his father's death in c. 1290, Herve became Lord of Léon. His fief was the castle of La Roche-Maurice. He died in April 1304.

Issue 
Herve V married Joan of Rohan. They had several children:
 Herve VI, who succeeded his father;
 William I, Lord of Hacqueville, who married Catherine, daughter of Odo, Lord of La Roche-Bernard, in 1301;
 Amicia, who married Catherine's brother Bernard, Lord of La Roche-Bernard c. 1301.
 Isabella, who married William of Harcourt, Lord of Saussaye, an estate located about thirty kilometers from Noyon-sur-Andelle, possession of the House of Léon;
 Guy, whose existence is disputed and who is said to be a Bishop of Léon and a defender of the town of Hennebont in 1342 during the War of the Breton Succession;
 Raoul, whose existence is also disputed and who is said to be the ancestor of the Languéouez family;
 Oliver, Lord of Caudan, whose existence is disputed and who was more probably a son of William of Léon and Catherine of La Roche-Bernard.

References

Bibliographie 
Chaillou, Léa. The House of Léon: Genealogy and Origins. Foundations: The Journal of the Foundation for Medieval Genealogy, volume 11, 2019, pp. 19–48 
 Patrick Kernévez and Frédéric Morvan, Généalogie des Hervé de Léon (vers 1180-1363). Bulletin de la Société archéologique du Finistère, 2002, p 279-312.

1304 deaths
Lordship of Léon
People from Finistère
Year of birth unknown
14th-century Breton people